The 2010 Cheltenham Council election took place on 6 May 2010 to elect members of Cheltenham Borough Council in Gloucestershire, England. Half of the council was up for election and the Liberal Democrats stayed in overall control of the council.

After the election, the composition of the council was
Liberal Democrat 25
Conservative 12
People Against Bureaucracy 3

Candidates
In total 64 candidates stood in the election for the 22 seats that were being contested. Among those defending seats were 2 Liberal Democrat cabinet members, the Conservative group leader Stuart Hutton and 2 People Against Bureaucracy councillors. Other candidates included 12 from the Green Party, a record high for the party in Cheltenham.

Election result
The results saw the Liberal Democrats increase their majority on the council after gaining 4 seats from the Conservatives. Among the Conservative defeats to the Liberal Democrats was the Conservative group leader Stuart Hutton in Warden Hill ward and Conservative councillor David Hall who was defeated in Up Hatherley by 1 vote. The Liberal Democrat gains meant they held 25 seats after the election, as against 12 for the Conservatives and 3 People Against Bureaucracy councillors.

Ward results

Andrew McKinlay was a sitting councillor in St Paul’s.

References

2010 English local elections
May 2010 events in the United Kingdom
2010
2010s in Gloucestershire